"Anything Goes" is a song by the American rock band the Gregg Allman Band. It was the third single from their studio album I'm No Angel (1987), released on Epic Records.

The song reached number three on Billboard Album Rock Tracks chart.

Charts

References

1987 singles
1987 songs
Gregg Allman songs
Epic Records singles
Songs written by Gregg Allman